The 2021–22 Ghana Premier League was the 66th season of the top professional association football league in Ghana which began on 29 October 2021 and concluded on 19 June 2022. Hearts of Oak were the defending champions.

Asante Kotoko won the league for a record-extending 25th time and the first since 2014 after a 1-1 draw against Ashanti Gold and were handed the trophy on the season's final day after a 3-0 triumph over relegated Elmina Sharks. As champions, Kotoko will participate in the qualification procedures for the following season's CAF Champions League.

Teams 
Eighteen teams competed in the league; the 15 from the previous season and the 3 winners of the Division One League zones. The promoted teams were Bibiani Gold Stars and Accra Lions, who both achieved promotion for the first time. RTU returned to the league for the first time since their relegation in 2013.
They replaced Ebusua Dwarfs, Liberty Professionals and Inter Allies.

Stadiums and locations

Club managers and captains 
The table lists club managers.

Managerial changes

League table 
<onlyinclude>{{#invoke:Sports table|main|style=football
|update=complete|source=Ghana Premier League and 

|team_order=ASA, MED, BEC, KAR, GRE, HEA, ASH, BER, BIB, LEG, ADU, ACC, DRE, KIN, RTU, ELE, WAF, ELM

|result1=pro |result7=D3D |result6=CC |result16=rel|result17=rel|result18=rel

|win_ACC=12|draw_ACC=9 |loss_ACC=13|gf_ACC=26|ga_ACC=38
|win_ADU=11|draw_ADU=12|loss_ADU=11|gf_ADU=33|ga_ADU=28
|win_ASA=19|draw_ASA=10|loss_ASA=5 |gf_ASA=48|ga_ASA=20
|win_ASH=13|draw_ASH=8 |loss_ASH=13|gf_ASH=46|ga_ASH=37
|win_BEC=13|draw_BEC=15 |loss_BEC=6 |gf_BEC=37|ga_BEC=24
|win_BER=12|draw_BER=11 |loss_BER=11 |gf_BER=29|ga_BER=30
|win_BIB=14|draw_BIB=4 |loss_BIB=16|gf_BIB=34|ga_BIB=40
|win_DRE=11|draw_DRE=11 |loss_DRE=12|gf_DRE=47|ga_DRE=44
|win_ELE=10|draw_ELE=10 |loss_ELE=14|gf_ELE=29|ga_ELE=38
|win_ELM=5 |draw_ELM=8 |loss_ELM=21|gf_ELM=24|ga_ELM=57
|win_GRE=12|draw_GRE=12 |loss_GRE=10 |gf_GRE=36|ga_GRE=31
|win_HEA=12|draw_HEA=12|loss_HEA=10 |gf_HEA=33|ga_HEA=29
|win_KAR=13 |draw_KAR=13|loss_KAR=8 |gf_KAR=43|ga_KAR=33
|win_KIN=12 |draw_KIN=6 |loss_KIN=16|gf_KIN=30|ga_KIN=34
|win_LEG=11 |draw_LEG=13 |loss_LEG=10 |gf_LEG=34|ga_LEG=26
|win_MED=16|draw_MED=8 |loss_MED=10 |gf_MED=28|ga_MED=25
|win_RTU=10 |draw_RTU=11 |loss_RTU=13|gf_RTU=40|ga_RTU=48
|win_WAF=8 |draw_WAF=11 |loss_WAF=15|gf_WAF=27|ga_WAF=42

|name_ACC=Accra Lions
|name_ADU=Aduana Stars
|name_ASA=Asante Kotoko
|name_ASH=Ashanti Gold
|name_BEC=Bechem United
|name_BER=Berekum Chelsea
|name_BIB=Bibiani Gold Stars
|name_DRE=Dreams
|name_ELE=Eleven Wonders
|name_ELM=Elmina Sharks
|name_GRE=Great Olympics
|name_HEA=Hearts of Oak
|name_KAR=Karela United
|name_KIN=King Faisal
|name_LEG=Legon Cities
|name_MED=Medeama
|name_RTU=RTU
|name_WAF=WAFA

|res_col_header=PR
|col_pro=green1 |text_pro=Qualification for the CAF Champions League First Round
|col_rel=red1   |text_rel=Relegation to Division One League
|col_D3D=lightgray|text_D3D=Caught match-fixing and admitted to the Division Two League 
|col_CC=blue2  |text_CC=Qualification for the CAF Confederation Cup First Round
|note_res_D3D=Ashanti Gold were caught match-fixing and were relegated.
|note_res_CC=Hearts Of Oak qualified for the CAF Confederation Cup as the 2021–22 Ghanaian FA Cup winners
}}

 Results

Promotion play-offs
On July 17th the GFA annound that there will be a play-off between the three second-placed clubs in the Division One Leagues.

The three 2nd placed clubs, Tamale City FC, Mysterious Ebusua Dwarfs FC and Liberty Professionals will play in a three-way League to determine the replacement for AshantiGold SC.

Season statistics

Top scorers

Hat-tricks

 Notes
(H) – Home team(A) – Away team

Assists

Clean sheets

Awards

Monthly awards 
As of 4 May 2022

See also 
 2021–22 Ghana Women's Premier League
2021–22 Ghanaian FA Cup

References

External links 

 

Ghana Premier League
Football in Ghana
2022 in Ghanaian sport
2021–22 in Ghanaian football